The snowy cotinga (Carpodectes nitidus) is a medium-sized species of passerine bird in the family Cotingidae. It is found in Central America where its natural habitats are subtropical or tropical moist lowland forests and heavily degraded former forests. The male is white and the female pale grey and both sexes are readily recognisable.

Description
The male is very conspicuous and is entirely white, apart from a slight bluish-grey tinge on head and back. The upper parts of the female are pale brownish-grey with slightly darker wings bordered with white. There is a white ring round the eye and the underparts are greyish-white. In both sexes the beak is bluish-grey, and this distinguishes the birds from the otherwise similar yellow-billed cotinga (Carpodectes antoniae). The female might also be confused with the black-crowned tityra (Tityra inquisitor) or the masked tityra (Tityra semifasciata) but those species both have more colour on the head.

Distribution and habitat
The snowy cotinga is native to lowland humid forests of Guatemala, Honduras, Nicaragua, Costa Rica and Panama.

Status
Though generally an uncommon species, the snowy cotinga has a wide range and any decline in total population is slight. The International Union for Conservation of Nature has assessed its conservation status as being of "least concern".

References

snowy cotinga
Birds of Honduras
Birds of Nicaragua
Birds of Costa Rica
snowy cotinga
snowy cotinga
Taxonomy articles created by Polbot